Olmos is an unincorporated community in Bee County, in the U.S. state of Texas. According to the Handbook of Texas, the community had no population estimates in 2000. It is located within the Beeville micropolitan area.

History
The community's original name was Los Olmos, which is Spanish for "the elm trees". It was shortened to Olmos in 1917. The area was first settled by Hank D. Sullivan sometime before 1860. He and his brother, Joe, started ranching in the community after the Civil War. Englishwomen Charlotte and Eliza Cobb settled in 1866 and brought 1,000 sheep with them. The San Antonio and Aransas Pass Railway built a track about 8 miles east of Olmos in 1888. A Catholic church was built that same year. Its population was 70 with a cotton gin and a store in 1940. The store, which was operated by Frank Russek, closed around 1975. The Olmos Community Club continued to operate in 1990 and there were no population estimates in 2000. Most of its residents were of Czech ancestry.

Geography
It is located north of a creek of the same name.

Education
The first school in Olmos was built in 1893 and had one teacher and 24 White students enrolled in 1905. It continued to operate in 1940 until it became a part of the Skidmore-Tynan Independent School District and was turned over to the Olmos Community Club. The community continues to be served by the Skidmore-Tynan ISD today.

References

Unincorporated communities in Bee County, Texas
Unincorporated communities in Texas